The Christopher Brennan Award (formerly known as the Robert Frost Prize) is an Australian award given for lifetime achievement in poetry. The award, established in 1973, takes the form of a bronze plaque which is presented to a poet who produces work of "sustained quality and distinction". It was awarded by the Fellowship of Australian Writers and named after the poet Christopher Brennan. The most recent award was made in 2015.

Recipients
 2015 Gig Ryan
 2014 Alan Wearne
 2013 Judith Beveridge
 2012 Tim Thorne
 2011 Jennifer Harrison
 2010 Peter Steele
 2009 Jennifer Strauss
 2008 Robert Gray
 2007 John Kinsella
 2006 Geoff Page
 2005 Fay Zwicky
 2004 Kris Hemensley
 2003 Philip Salom
 2002 Dimitris Tsaloumas
 2001 Dorothy Porter
 2000 J. S. Harry
 1999 Kevin Hart
 1998 Jennifer Maiden
 1996 Dorothy Hewett
 1995 Thomas Shapcott
 1995 Robert Adamson
 1994 Judith Rodriguez
 1993 Geoffrey Dutton
 1992 R. A. Simpson
 1991 Elizabeth Riddell
 1989 Chris Wallace-Crabbe
 1988 Roland Robinson
 1983 Bruce Dawe
 1983 Les Murray
 1982 Vincent Buckley
 1980 John Blight
 1979 Rosemary Dobson
 1977 Gwen Harwood
 1976 A. D. Hope
 1975 Judith Wright
 1974 R. D. Fitzgerald

The award has been made posthumously on occasion - to Francis Webb, James McAuley and David Campbell. Other winners include: Thomas Shapcott, Fay Zwicky.

Footnotes

References
Sullivan, Jane (2005) "A well deserved tribute" in The Age, 27 March 2005
 Wilde, W., Hooton, J. & Andrews, B (1994) The Oxford Companion of Australian Literature 2nd ed. South Melbourne, Oxford University Press
National Awards - current information on Christopher Brennan Award posted by FAW's Victorian branch.

Australian poetry awards
Literary awards honoring lifetime achievement